The Old Hill Street Police Station is a historic building and former police station of the Singapore Police Force located at Hill Street within the Downtown Core in the Central Area of Singapore.

Also known as Balai Polis Hill Street Lama and (Chinese: 旧禧街警察局) in Malay and Chinese respectively, the name was changed from Old Hill Street Police Station to "MITA Building" in 1999, followed by "MICA Building" in 2004. After the change of ministries in November 2012, the name "MICA Building" was reverted to "Old Hill Street Police Station".

The building has a total of 927 windows and they are painted in the colours of the rainbow. Some may notice that the coloured windows on the first four stories have the same vibrant intensity, while the upper windows gradually intensify to accentuate the cantilevered balconies which are interesting architectural features of this historical building.

See also
 Singapore Police Force
 Ministry of Communications and Information

References

National Heritage Board (2002), Singapore's 100 Historic Places, Archipelago Press, 
Norman Edwards and Peter Keys (1996), Singapore – A Guide to Buildings, Streets and Places, Times Books International,

External links

 Old Hill Street Police Station
 Singapore Infopedia on The MICA Building
 A mix of colours at Fort Canning Hill
 Singapore Police Force

Police stations in Singapore
Tourist attractions in Singapore
National monuments of Singapore
Government buildings completed in 1934
Museum Planning Area
1934 establishments in Singapore
20th-century architecture in Singapore